The Latin word insula (literally meaning "island", plural insulae) was used in Roman cities to mean either a city block in a city plan, i.e. a building area surrounded by four streets, or, later, a type of apartment building that occupied such a city block specifically in Rome and nearby Ostia. The latter type of Insulae were known to be prone to fire and rife with disease.

A standard Roman city plan was based on a grid of orthogonal (laid out on right angles) streets. It was founded on ancient Greek city models, described by Hippodamus. It was used especially when new cities were established, e.g. in Roman coloniae. 

The streets of each city were designated the decumani (east–west-oriented) and cardines (north–south).  The principal streets, the Decumanus Maximus and Cardo Maximus, intersected at or close to the forum, around which the most important public buildings were sited.

References

Sources and further reading
The Insula IX Excavation: http://www.reading.ac.uk/silchester/town-life/insula_ix.php
Pompeii Insula 9: http://donovanimages.co.nz/proxima-veritati/insula-9/index.html

History of urban planning
Ancient Roman city planning